Cecilia Ansaldo Briones (born 1949) is an Ecuadorian professor, essayist, and literary critic.

Biography
Cecilia Ansaldo was born in Guayaquil in 1949. She completed her secondary studies at the Dolores Baquerizo school, and higher education at the Universidad Católica de Santiago de Guayaquil, where she obtained a licentiate in educational sciences.

During her teaching career she has worked at the Santo Domingo de Guzmán school, the German School of Guayaquil, the Universidad Católica de Santiago de Guayaquil, and the Mónica Herrera School, among others. She was also dean of the Universidad Católica's faculty of philosophy and letters and rector of the German School.

In 2015 she became a member of the Academia Ecuatoriana de la Lengua a correspondent organization of the Royal Spanish Academy. She is an opinion columnist in the newspaper El Universo, a member of the Mujeres del Ático group, and a founding member of the Open Book Station Cultural Center. She has chaired the 's content committee since 2015.

Awards and recognitions
 Medal of Merit from the Mayor of Guayaquil, 2008
 Medal of Merit from the Philanthropic Society of Guayas, 2012
 Career Tribute from the Universidad Católica de Santiago de Guayaquil, 2018

Publications

Essays
 "El cuento ecuatoriano de los últimos 30 años" in La literatura ecuatoriana en los últimos 30 años 1950–1980 (1983), El Conejo: Quito
 "Dos décadas de cuento ecuatoriano 1970–1990" in La literatura ecuatoriana de las dos últimas décadas 1970–1990 (1993), University of Cuenca
 "Una mirada 'otra' a ciertos personajes femeninos de la narrativa ecuatoriana" in Memorias del V encuentro de literatura ecuatoriana (1995), University of Cuenca

Anthologies
 Cuento contigo: antología del cuento ecuatoriano (1993), Universidad Católica de Santiago de Guayaquil, Universidad Andina Simón Bolívar
 Las mujeres del ático tienen la palabra (1994)
 Cuentos de Guayaquil: antología (2011), Municipality of Guayaquil, 
 Antología del cuento ecuatoriano (2012), with Elisa Ayala González, Municipality of Guayaquil,

References

External links
 Cecilia Ansaldo Briones at El Universo

1949 births
20th-century Ecuadorian educators
20th-century Ecuadorian women writers
21st-century Ecuadorian women writers
Ecuadorian columnists
Ecuadorian literary critics
Women literary critics
Ecuadorian women essayists
Living people
People from Guayaquil
Universidad Católica de Santiago de Guayaquil alumni
Academic staff of Universidad Católica de Santiago de Guayaquil
Ecuadorian women columnists